Dynein, axonemal, heavy chain 7 is a protein in humans that is encoded by the DNAH7 gene.

DNAH7 is a component of the inner dynein arm of ciliary axonemes (Zhang et al., 2002 [PubMed 11877439]).[supplied by OMIM, Mar 2008]. ##RefSeq-Attributes-START## Transcript_exon_combination_evidence :: AB023161.2, AF327442.1                                         [ECO:0000332] ##RefSeq-Attributes-END##

References

Further reading

Human proteins